Jimmy, Jim, or Jimmie Johnson may refer to:

Sports

American football
Jimmy Johnson (quarterback) (1879–1942), American football player
Jimmy Johnson (cornerback) (born 1938), American football cornerback
Jimmy Johnson (American football coach) (born 1943), former college football and National Football League coach, now television sports analyst
Jimmie Johnson (American football) (born 1966), American football tight end
Jim Johnson (coach) (1912–2004), American football, basketball, and baseball player, coach
Jim Johnson (American football) (1941–2009), NFL assistant coach most notably with the Philadelphia Eagles

Baseball
Jimmy Johnson (pitcher) (1918–1987), American baseball pitcher in the Negro leagues and Mexican League
Jimmy Johnson (1930s shortstop), American baseball shortstop in the Negro leagues
Jimmy Johnson (1940s shortstop), American baseball shortstop in the Mexican League and Negro leagues
Jimmy Johnson (baseball, born 1947), minor league baseball player, coach and manager
Jim Johnson (baseball, born 1945) (1945–1987), American baseball pitcher (1967–1970) and briefly a member of 1970 San Francisco Giants
Jim Johnson (baseball, born 1983) (born 1983), American baseball relief pitcher

Other sports
Jimmie Johnson (born 1975), professional American auto racing driver
Jim Johnson (rugby league) (1881–1956), New Zealand international
Jim Johnson (boxer) (1887–1918), or Battling Jim Johnson, early 20th century heavyweight 
Jim Johnson (footballer, born 1923) (1923–1987), English footballer for Grimsby Town and Carlisle United
Jim Johnson (jockey) (1929–2021), Australian jockey, remembered primarily for winning the Melbourne Cup
Jim Johnson (ice hockey, born 1942) (1942–2021), forward for the Philadelphia Flyers and Minnesota Fighting Saints
Jim Johnson (ice hockey, born 1962), defenceman for the Pittsburgh Penguins and Minnesota North Stars
Jim Johnson (athletic director), current athletics director in the NCAA Division II

Music 
Jimmy Johnson (session guitarist) (1943–2019), American guitarist and producer from Alabama
Jimmy Johnson (blues guitarist) (1928–2022), American blues guitarist from Mississippi
Jimmy Johnson (rapper), member of Prime Boys
Jimmy Johnson (bassist) (born 1956), American bass guitarist best known for his work with James Taylor

Entertainment 
Jimmy Johnson (actor) (died 2020), Nigerian actor
Jim Johnson (radio) (born 1945), Chicago radio personality
Jimmy Johnson (cartoonist), creator of Arlo and Janis

Other
Jim Johnson (British Army officer) (1924–2008)
James Paul Johnson (born 1930), known as Jim, U.S. Representative from Colorado
Jim Johnson (New Jersey politician) (born 1960), New Jersey-based activist and politician
Jimmy Johnson, a character in the TV series Silk

See also
Jim Jonsin, American music producer
Jim Johnston (disambiguation)
Jimmy Johnstone (1944–2006), Scottish footballer
James Johnson (disambiguation)